is the capital city of Okayama Prefecture in the Chūgoku region of Japan. The city was founded on June 1, 1889. , the city has an estimated population of 720,841 and a population density of 910 persons per km2.

The city is the site of Kōraku-en, known as one of the top three traditional gardens in Japan, and Okayama Castle, which is ranked among the best 100 Japanese castles. The city is famous as the setting of the Japanese fable "Momotarō". Okayama joined the UNESCO Global Network of Learning Cities in 2016.

History

Sengoku period to Teisho period 

Before the Muromachi period, Okayama was one corner of a farm region and included a small castle built by the Kanemitsu. In the Sengoku period, Ukita Naoie attacked Okayama and attacked the castle for the transportation resources and extensive farmland in the region. Naoie remodeled the castle, built the old Sanyo road to the central part of the castle town, and called in craftsmen both from inside and outside of Bizen Province. Okayama became the political and economical capital of Bizen Province.

Edo period
In 1600, Ukita Hideie, who was the son of Naoie and the lord of Okayama, lost at the Battle of Sekigahara. The next year, Kobayakawa Hideaki came to Okayama and became the feudal lord of Okayama Domain. Hideaki died in 1602, however, ending the Kobayakawa line. Ikeda Tadatugu, who was the feudal lord of Himeji Domain, became the next lord of Okayama. After this time, Okayama was ruled by the Ikedas until the latter part of the 19th century. Continuing its economic development, Okayama became one of the ten best large castle towns in Japan in the 18th century. The Korakuen Garden was developed by the fourth feudal lord, Ikeda Tsunamasa.

Meiji Restoration to World War II

On August 29, 1871, the new Meiji government of the Empire of Japan replaced the traditional feudal domain system with centralized government authority (Prefectures of Japan). Okayama became the capital of Okayama Prefecture. In 1889, Okayama City was founded. In the Meiji period, a railroad was built in Okayama city that greatly enhanced the development of the city. Okayama became one of the most important places in western Japan for transportation and education. When World War II began, Okayama city had a Japanese Army base camp. On June 29, 1945, the city was attacked by the US Army Air Forces with incendiary bombs. Almost all the city was burned, and more than 1700 people were killed. Okayama suffered terrible damage in the war, losing more than 12,000 households.

Since World War II
During Japan's economic boom of the 1960s, Okayama developed rapidly as one of the most important cities in the Chūgoku and Shikoku regions.

In 1988, the Seto-Ōhashi Bridge was opened, and connected Okayama with Shikoku directly by rail and road.

The city became a core city in 1996 and a designated city on April 1, 2009.

Geography

The city of Okayama is located in the southern part of Okayama Prefecture, which in turn is located in western part of the island of Honshū. The city is bounded on the south by the Inland Sea. Asahi River crosses Okayama.

Since Okayama became a designated city in 2009, the city has been divided into four wards (ku).

Mergers
 On March 22, 2005 - the town of Mitsu (from Mitsu District), and the town of Nadasaki (from Kojima District) were merged into Okayama.
 On January 22, 2007 - the town of Takebe (from Mitsu District), and the town of Seto (from Akaiwa District) were merged into Okayama.

Kojima, Mitsu, and Akaiwa Districts have all since been dissolved as a result of these mergers.

Climate
Okayama has a mild climate in comparison to most of Japan. It has the most rain-free days (less than 1mm of precipitation) of any city in Japan. It is ranked as the second driest and the fourth sunniest city in the Chūgoku region. The climate is classified under the Köppen climate classification as humid subtropical (Cfa).

The local climate is warm enough throughout the year to support olive trees. Okayama is often called "Land of Sunshine" because of its low number of rainy days per year.

Economy

Agriculture
The city is located in the Okayama Plain, where rice, eggplant, and white Chinese chives are notable products. White peaches and grapes are cultivated in the mountainous, northern part of the city.

Industry
In 2005, the city's gross domestic product was 800 billion yen, nearly 10% of the GDP of Okayama Prefecture. 
Greater Okayama, Okayama Metropolitan Employment Area, has a GDP of US$63.1 billion as of 2010. The main industries are machine tools, chemicals, foodstuffs and printing. Kōnan, a district in the southern part of the city, is the most developed industrial zone.

Commerce
Okayama is the core of the Okayama metropolitan area, which includes the cities of Kurashiki and Sōja. The main commercial district is Omotechō, near Okayama Castle and Kōraku-en, and the area surrounding Okayama Station. Omotechō has many covered shopping arcades.

The headquarters of Aeon Corporation, a private English language school with more than 3,000 employees, is located in Okayama.

Culture

Okayama Castle and Kōraku-en are Okayama's most notable attractions.

Okayama Castle (nicknamed  ( 'crow castle') was constructed in 1597 by Ukita Naoie, a Japanese feudal lord. It was destroyed by bombing in 1945 during World War II but reconstructed in 1966.

Kōraku-en, known as one of the three best traditional gardens in Japan, lies south of the castle grounds. Kōrakuen was constructed by Ikeda Tsunamasa over 14 years, and completed in 1700.

Sōgen-ji, a large Buddhist monastery belonging to the Rinzai sect, is located near the center of the city. Several of the abbots of major monasteries in Kyoto are from Sōgen-ji.

Festivals
Every August since 1994 Okayama has seen the Momotarō Matsuri (Festival), which is an amalgam of three different festivals, including the  'ogre' festival, which is a kind of Yosakoi dance.

Music and the arts

Okayama has a professional symphony orchestra, the Okayama Symphony Orchestra, which performs at the Okayama Symphony Hall. Inryō-ji, a Buddhist temple near the city centre, regularly hosts concerts.

There are many museums in the city, including the Okayama Prefectural Museum, the Okayama Prefectural Museum of Art, the Hayashibara Museum of Art, the Okayama Orient Museum, the Yumeji Art Museum, and the Okayama Digital Museum.

Cuisine
Okayama has several traditional dishes.Barazushi, a dish made with sushi rice, contains fresh fish from the Seto Inland Sea. Kibi dango (Okayama) gel-like balls made from a powder of millet and rice, are well known sweets from the area.

Media

The Sanyo Shimbun is the local newspaper serving the greater Okayama area. There are six television stations serving the Okayama area and part of Kagawa Prefecture. Three FM and three AM radio stations also serve the region.
TV Stations

Radio Stations

Sports
Okayama has many sports teams. In recent years, volleyball team Okayama Seagulls and football club Fagiano Okayama have been established. In 2009, Fagiano Okayama FC gained promotion to the J. League, the highest football league in Japan.

Okayama was the birthplace of the 31st Yokozuna, Tsunenohana Kan'ichi, in 1896. He won 10 championships, 8 during his time as a Yokozuna.

Education

Okayama University, founded as a medical school in 1870 and established in 1949 as a national university, is in the city. Today, Okayama University is one of Okayama's largest universities, with 11 faculties and six graduate schools.

There are seven private universities, three junior colleges, 24 high schools (16 public, eight private), seven combined junior high/high schools (two public, five private), 37 junior high schools (36 municipal, one national) and 93 elementary schools (91 municipal, two private) in the city.

Universities
 Okayama University (national)
 Notre Dame Seishin University (private)
 Okayama University of Science (private)
 Okayama Shoka University (private)
 Sanyo Gakuen University (private)
 Shujitsu University (private)
 Chugoku Gakuen University (private)
 International Pacific University (private)

High schools 
Okayama Joto Senior High School
Okayama Ichinomiya Senior High School
Okayama Asahi Senior High School
Okayama Sozan Senior High School
Okayama Hosen Senior High School
Okayama Gakugeikan High School

Transportation

Intercity rail
JR West's Okayama Station is a major interchange, with trains from Shikoku, Sanin and Sanyo connecting to the Sanyo Shinkansen. Local rail lines serving Okayama Station include:
Sanyo Main Line,
Hakubi Line,
Akō Line,
Uno Line,
Seto-Ōhashi Line,
Tsuyama Line, and
Kibi Line.

 JR West – San'yo Shinkansen

 JR West – San'yo Main Line
 –  –  –  –  –  – Okayama –  – 
 JR West – Ako Line
  –  – Higashi-Okayama
 JR West – Uno Line
Okayama –  –  –  –  – (Hayashima Town - Kurashiki City) –  –  – 
 JR West – Seto-Ohashi Line

 JR West – Tsuyama Line
 Okayama –  –  –  –  –  –  –  – 
 JR West – Kibi Line
Okayama –  –  –  –  –  –

Tramway
Okayama has kept an operational tram system since the Meiji period. It is managed by Okayama Electric Tramway and offers two lines: the Higashiyama Main Line and the Seikibashi Line.

Bus
Seven bus companies provide service within the city limits:
,
,
,
,
,
, and
.

Air
Okayama Airport, located in the northern part of the city, provides domestic service to Tokyo-Haneda, Sapporo-Chitose, Okinawa-Naha, and Kagoshima.

Kōnan Airport, located to the south, has been a general aviation airport since the opening of Okayama Airport in 1988.

Notable people

Before the fall of Edo
 Eisai (Buddhist priest, 1141–1215)
 Hideie Ukita (Military commander, 1573–1655)
 Kōan Ogata (Rangaku practitioner, 1810–1863)

Arts 
 Shigeru Nanba (painter, 1944– )
 Takashi Fukutani (manga artist, 1952–2000)
 Masashi Kishimoto (manga artist, 1974– )
 Seishi Kishimoto (manga artist, 1974– )

Politics
 Ichirō Aisawa (Member of the House of Representatives, 1954– )
 Kenji Eda (Member of the House of Representatives, Secretary General of Your Party, 1956– )
 Satsuki Eda (Member of the House of Councillors, 27th President of the House of Councillors, 1941– )
 Seiji Hagiwara (31st, 32nd Mayor of Okayama, member of the House of Representatives, fourth Mayor of Mimasaka, Okayama, 1956– )
 Shigeo Takaya (33rd, 34th Mayor of Okayama, 1937– )
 Tsuyoshi Inukai (Member of the House of Representatives, 29th Prime Minister of Japan, 1855–1932)
 Masahiro Ishii (5th Governor of Okayama Prefecture, Member of the House of Councillors, 1945– )
 Yoshihiro Katayama (Governor of Tottori Prefecture, Minister of Internal Affairs and Communications, 1951– )
 Akihiko Kumashiro (Member of the House of Representatives, 1940– )
 Keisuke Tsumura (Member of the House of Representatives, 1971– )
 Michiyoshi Yunoki (Member of the House of Representatives, 1972– )

Literature
 Suiin Emi (novelist, 1869–1934)
 Yōko Ogawa (novelist, 1962– )
 Hyakken Uchida (novelist, 1889–1971)
 Junnosuke Yoshiyuki (novelist, 1924–1994)

Entertainment

 Angela Aki (singer-songwriter, 1977– ) (attended middle school in Okayama)
 Yōko Aramaki (impressionist and singer, 1981– )
 Dorlis (musician, 1982– )
 Satoshi Inoue (member of Jichō Kachō, 1976– )
 Yumbo Dump (comedy geniuses)
 Hiroto Kōmoto (musician, 1963– )
 Shin Koyamada (actor, 1982– )
 Shinji Morisue (former artistic gymnast and TV personality, 1957– )
 Matsunosuke Onoe (actor and film director, 1875–1926)
 Kōji Satō (actor, 1963– )
 Etsuko Shihomi (actress, 1955– )
 Yukiko Takaguchi (voice actor, 1974– )
 Tomu Uchida (film director, 1898–1970)
 Riki Nishimura, (member of the K-pop boy group Enhypen, born 2005 )
 Misa (Bassist for Band-Maid - October 15)
 Miku Nishizaki (member of Ocha Norma - born 2006)
 Fujii Kaze (singer-songwriter , born June 14th 1997)

Sports
 Noboru Akiyama (professional baseball player and coach, 1934–2000)
 Yuko Arimori (athlete, 1966– )
 Naoko Hashimoto (volleyball player, 1984– )
 Shigeaki Hattori (racing driver and team owner, 1963– )
 Kinue Hitomi (athlete, 1907–1931)
 Masahiro Kawai (professional baseball player, 1964– )
 Issei Morita (professional baseball player, 1989– )
 Hikaru Sato (professional wrestler and mixed martial artist, 1980– )
 Hinako Shibuno (professional golfer, 1998- )
 Kiyoshi Tamura (professional wrestler, 1969– )
 Hisashi Tsuchida (soccer player, 1967– )

Inventions 

 Seiichi Miyake (inventor of tactile paving, 1926–1982)

Twin towns – sister cities

Okayama is twinned with:

 Luoyang, Henan,  China (1981)
 Plovdiv, Bulgaria (1972)
 San José, Costa Rica (1969)
 San Antonio, Texas,  United States (1976)
 San Jose, California,  United States (1957)
 Ninh Binh, Ninh Bình Province, Vietnam (2018)

Friendships
 Bucheon, Gyeonggi-do, South Korea (2002)
 Hsinchu, Taiwan (2003)
 Pune, Maharashtra,   India (2014)

Points of interest

 Korakuen Garden
 Handayama Botanical Garden
 Okayama Castle
 Okayama Prefectural Museum
 Okayama Orient Museum
 Okayama Prefectural Museum of Art
 Hayashibara Museum of Art
 Yumeji Art Museum
 Kibitsu Shrine
 Kibitsuhiko Shrine
 Okayama Symphony Hall
 Okayama University
 Inryoji Temple

References

External links

 Okayama City official website 
 Okayama City official website
 I Love Okayama - Okayama global brand
 

 
Cities in Okayama Prefecture
Port settlements in Japan
Populated coastal places in Japan
Cities designated by government ordinance of Japan